Csíkszék was one of the Székely seats in the historical Székely Land.

It administered two sub-seats (Hungarian: fiúszék, Latin: sedes filialis), namely Gyergyószék and Kászonszék. It was divided on the natural borders of the region, as the main territory of Csíkszék lay in the valley of the Olt River, Gyergyószék lay in the valley of the Maros river, while Kászonszék lay in the valley of the Kászon river.

Population
The religious composition of Csíkszék's population in 1867 was as follows:

Roman Catholic: 96,525
Greek Catholic: 13,028
Eastern Orthodox: 17
Others: 1.667
Total: 111,237

Gallery

References
 Orbán, Balázs (1868). A Székelyföld leírása. Pest: Panda és Frohna Könyvnyomdája.

States and territories established in the 12th century
States and territories disestablished in 1876
1876 disestablishments in Hungary